Peter Cockroft (born 13 April 1957 in Catterick, North Riding of Yorkshire) is an English weather forecaster. Cockroft joined the BBC in 1991 as one of the presenters of the national weather forecasts; in 2002, he became the main weather presenter on BBC London News. He gave his last broadcast for BBC London on 27 December 2013.

Biography
He attended Swanage Grammar School. He left school with 8 O levels, and later gained an ONC and HND in science and physics.

He joined the Met Office in 1974, although he did not become a weather forecaster until 1990. He joined the BBC in 1991, after being spotted by Bill Giles when forecasting for the Royal Air Force, and became one of the presenters of the national weather forecasts. In 2002, he became the main weather presenter on BBC London News. He left BBC London News on 27 December 2013.

He lives in Oxfordshire with his wife Ann and daughter Rosie.

References

BBC forecast from 28 April 1993 by Peter Cockcroft https://www.youtube.com/watch?v=g9BSrMmOoVU

1957 births
Living people
People from Swanage
English meteorologists
English television presenters
BBC weather forecasters
People educated at Swanage Grammar School